Masalski Książe III is a Polish coat of arms used by the Massalski szlachta family in the times of the Polish–Lithuanian Commonwealth.

History

Blazon

Notable bearers
 Ignacy Jakub Massalski
 Michał Józef Massalski

See also
 Polish heraldry

Polish coats of arms